Club de Futbol Igualada is a Spanish football team based in Igualada, in the autonomous community of Catalonia. Founded in 1939, it plays in Tercera División – Group 5, holding home matches at Estadi Les Comes, with a capacity of 4,500 seats.

Season to season

34 seasons in Tercera División

Notable players
 Rubén Epitié
 Carlos
 Josep Clotet
 Guillem Martí
 Jordi Tarrés

References

External links
Official website 

Football clubs in Catalonia
Association football clubs established in 1939
Divisiones Regionales de Fútbol clubs
Igualada
1939 establishments in Spain